WJKF-CD (channel 9) is a low-power, Class A independent television station in Jacksonville, Florida, United States. Owned by Abacus Television, the station maintains transmitter facilities on Newton Road on Jacksonville's east side.

Subchannels
The station's digital signal is multiplexed:

References

JKF-CD
Low-power television stations in the United States
Story Television affiliates
Classic Reruns TV affiliates
Television channels and stations established in 1997
1997 establishments in Florida